The 1996 Colgate Red Raiders football team was an American football team that represented Colgate University during the 1996 NCAA Division I-AA football season. Colgate tied for second in the Patriot League. 

In its first season under head coach Dick Biddle, the team compiled a 6–5 record. Marcus Cameron and Adam Sofran were the team captains. 

The Red Raiders outscored opponents 285 to 254. Their 3–2 conference record tied for second in the six-team Patriot League standings. 

The team played its home games at Andy Kerr Stadium in Hamilton, New York.

Schedule

References

Colgate
Colgate Raiders football seasons
Colgate Red Raiders football